USCGC Assateague (WPB-1337) was an Island-class cutter of the United States Coast Guard. Assateague was constructed at Bollinger Machine Shop and Shipyard in Lockport, Louisiana, and commissioned on 15 June 1990.

Service history
Currently operating in the Coast Guard 14th District, the cutter reports to Sector Guam. Assateague supports multi-mission operations throughout Sector Guam’s vast area of responsibility, which includes the U.S. Exclusive Economic Zones surrounding Guam and the Commonwealth of the Northern Mariana Islands and an international SAR area that includes the Republic of Palau and the Federated States of Micronesia, conducting search and rescue response missions, and ports, waterways and coastal security operations.

Design
The Island-class patrol boats were constructed in Bollinger Shipyards, Lockport, Louisiana. It is powered two Paxman Valenta 16 CM diesel engines. It has two  3304B diesel generators made by Caterpillar; these serve as motor–generators. Its hull is constructed from highly strong steel, and the superstructure and major deck are constructed from aluminium.

It is fitted with one  machine gun and two  M60 light machine guns; it may also be fitted with two Browning .50 Caliber Machine Guns. It is fitted with satellite navigation systems, collision avoidance systems, surface radar, and a Loran C system. Its complement is sixteen (two officers and fourteen crew members). Island-class patrol boats are based on Vosper Thornycroft  patrol boats and have similar dimensions. Coast Guard Cutter Assateague was decommissioned September 23, 2017.

Notes

References
USCGC Assateague page

Island-class patrol boats
1989 ships
Ships built in Lockport, Louisiana